Oxya hyla is a species of grasshopper of the Acrididae family described by Serville in 1831.

References

hyla
Taxa described in 1831